Anochetus madaraszi is a species of ant of the subfamily Ponerinae, which can be found in India, Sri Lanka, and Bangladesh.

References

Animaldiversity.org
Itis.org

External links
 at antwiki.org

Ponerinae
Hymenoptera of Asia
Insects described in 1897